Clem Nunatak is an isolated rock nunatak,  high, standing at the west side of Skelton Glacier,  southwest of Halfway Nunatak. It was named by the Advisory Committee on Antarctic Names in 1964 for Willis R. Clem, a construction mechanic at McMurdo Station in 1959.

References 

Nunataks of the Ross Dependency
Hillary Coast